Lemyra crama is a moth of the family Erebidae. It was described by Karel Černý in 2009.

References

 

crama
Moths described in 2009